The University of Hawaii at Hilo (UH Hilo) is a public university in Hilo, Hawaii. It is one of ten general campuses of the University of Hawaiʻi System. It was founded as Hilo Center at Lyman Hall of the Hilo Boys School in 1945 and was a branch campus of the University of Hawaiʻi at Mānoa. In 1970 it was reorganized by an act of the Hawaiʻi State Legislature and became a campus within the newly created University of Hawaiʻi System.

The university has been accredited by the WASC Senior College and University Commission or its predecessor since 1976. It offers thirty-three undergraduate and three graduate degree programs and has about 3,000 students; most students are residents of Hawaii but many are international students.

History
Although post-high school non-credit courses had been offered in Hilo as early as 1945, under the University of Hawai'i (at Mānoa)'s Adult Education Services, the university was established as Hilo Center at Lyman Hall of the Hilo Boys School. After an attempt to close the school in 1951 by Governor Oren E. Long, Big Island residents, local legislators, and the UH Alumni Association led efforts to save its only college to then establish the University of Hawai'i Hilo Branch as an two-year campus of the university.

In 1955, the branch moved to its present location on a thirty-acre parcel of land with an enlarged faculty to support its growing student population.

In 1964, University of Hawai'i president Thomas Hamilton released a feasibility study on creating a statewide system of community colleges operating as part of the university. The study recommended that the Hilo Branch and the Hawaii Technical School to create a community college in Hilo. However, due to resistance from Big Island legislators, Hawaii Technical School became Hawaii Community College with oversight from the Hawaii Department of Education. Both Hawaii Community College and the Hilo Branch, however, would share the same facilities until 1984.

In 1970, University of Hawai'i president Harlan Cleveland led efforts to reorganize the Hilo Branch by renaming the campus to Hilo College and merged with Hawaii Community College. Collectively they were known as the University of Hawai'i at Hilo with Paul Miwa as its first chancellor.

Amid a failed plan to create a new state college system, of which the UH Hilo would be its 'flagship', Hawai'i Community College was separated from university in 1990. In the 1990s, the former branch campus of the University of Hawai'i (at Mānoa) would emphasize liberal arts, education, agriculture, and vocational programs.

Academics

The university specializes in marine science, volcanology, astronomy, and Hawaiian studies. The Masters of Arts program in Hawaiian Language and Literature was the first in the United States to focus on an indigenous language.

Colleges
College of Agriculture, Forestry, and Natural Resource Management
College of Arts & Sciences
College of Business and Economics
Ka Haka ‘Ula O Ke‘elikōlani, College of Hawaiian Language
Daniel K. Inouye College of Pharmacy (DKICP)
College of Natural and Health Sciences

Undergraduate
The University of Hawaii at Hilo offers BA, BBA, BS, and BSN degrees in addition to certificates.  Students can also choose minors in some programs.

Graduate
The University of Hawai'i at Hilo offers a Master of Arts in Counseling Psychology, which meets educational requirements for licensure as a Licensed Mental Health Counselor. The program is accredited by the Masters in Psychology and Counseling Accreditation Council (MPCAC).

Athletics

Until 1994 UH Hilo belonged to the National Association of Intercollegiate Athletics or NAIA. Since 1992, it has been a member of the NCAA Division II Pacific West Conference. It fields teams in baseball, basketball, cross country, golf, soccer, softball, tennis and volleyball. The sports teams nickname is the Vulcans.

Chancellors
Shared with University of Hawaiʻi – West Oʻahu 1976–1997.

Bonnie D. Irwin (2019–present)
Marcia Sakai (Interim, 2017–2019)
Donald O. Straney (2010–2017)
Rose Tseng (1998–2010)
Kenneth Perrin (1993–1997)
Edward J. Kormondy (1986–1993)
Edwin Mookini (1975–1978)
Paul Miwa (1970–?)

Argument for separation
There has been a growing movement throughout the last decade to separate the Hilo campus from the UUniversity of Hawaiʻi system, creating a "Hawaiʻi State University". Supporters of the separation argue that the growing Hilo campus is "shortchanged" by its sister campus in Mānoa and that being independent of the system would allow the college to grow faster, better serve the community, and draw in more money from independent sources. Opponents argue that the state is too small for competing university systems and that financial divisions between Mānoa and Hilo are fair, given that Mānoa places emphasis on research and Hilo places emphasis on teaching. There are also concerns that this movement will hurt relationships between the Hilo campus and the rest of the University of Hawaiʻi system.

A bill was introduced in the 2005 session of the House of Representatives of the Hawaii State Legislature to draft legislation to spin off the Hilo campus as the independent Hawaii State University. The bill was approved by the House Higher Education Committee but no hearing on the bill was planned by the House Finance Committee, effectively killing it.

Points of interest at UH Hilo

University Park
ʻImiloa Astronomy Center
College of Tropical Agriculture and Human Resources (CTAHR)
USDA Pacific Basin – Agricultural Research Center
Kū Kahau Ula – UH Institute for Astronomy
Daniel K. Inouye College of Pharmacy (DKICP) – formerly J. M. Long Pavilion
East Asian Observatory, owning the facility of the old Joint Astronomy Centre (JAC)

Main Campus
University Classroom Building (UCB)
Marine Science Building (MSB)
Sciences & Technology Building (STB)
Edith Kanakaole Hall (EKH)
Wentworth Hall
Campus Center
Student Life Center & Pool
Edwin H. Mookini Library & Media Center
University of Hawaiʻi Hilo Student Services Building
University of Hawaiʻi Hilo New Gymnasium
University of Hawaiʻi Hilo Performing Arts Center

Alumni
Jon Hill, former White House Executive Chef
Harry Kim (attended), Mayor of Hawaii County
Anthony Leone (attended), professional Mixed Martial Artist
Sarah Palin (attended), former governor of Alaska
Tarisi Vunidilo, Fijian archaeologist and curator

See also
University of Hawaiʻi at Hilo Botanical Gardens
Hawaii–Hilo Vulcans women's volleyball

References

External links

Hawaii–Hilo Athletics website

1941 establishments in Hawaii
Education in Hawaii County, Hawaii
University of Hawaiʻi
Hawaii, University of
Schools accredited by the Western Association of Schools and Colleges
Buildings and structures in Hilo, Hawaii
Education in Hilo, Hawaii
Educational institutions established in 1941